Sumeria, or Sumer, is the region of city-states in ancient Mesopotamia.

Sumeria may also refer to:
1970 Sumeria, a minor planet
"Donna Sumeria", a song on the 2006 Mission of Burma album The Obliterati
"Sumeria", a song on Canadian musician Devin Townsend's 2011 album Deconstruction

See also
Sumerian (disambiguation)
Sumer (disambiguation)